The Governor of Maguindanao del Sur is the highest political office in the province of Maguindanao del Sur, Philippines.

History
Following the 2022 Maguindanao division plebiscite of September 17, 2022, Maguindanao was split into Maguindanao del Sur and Maguindanao del Norte provinces. The charter legislation of the two provinces, Republic Act No. 11550 provides for an acting governors for the newly formed subdivisions. Mariam Mangudadatu, the last governor of Maguindanao was supposed to assume the position of governor of Maguindanao del Sur. However this was uncertain, since the relevant provision which dictates the initial province officials presumes that the plebiscite would be held before the May 2022 national elections but the division vote was postponed after that date.

This led to the Commission on Elections to come up with a legal opinion. The position was issued on September 28, 2022, where the election body conclude that only the Department of the Interior and Local Government could appoint the first officials of the province.

The initial set of officials for the two new provinces would take the oath on October 13, 2022 including Mangudadatu as governor of Maguindanao del Sur. The Bangsamoro regional government has refused to recognized the officials taking note the "legal controversy" arising from postponing the plebiscite.

List of Governors

References 

	

Governors of provinces of the Philippines
2022 establishments in the Philippines
Governors of Maguindanao del Sur